Maxwell S. Harris (July 3, 1876 – April 14, 1933) was an American lawyer and politician from New York.

Life 
Harris was born on July 3, 1876, in New York City. He graduated from the College of the City of New York in 1897 with an A.B. In 1899, he graduated from New York University with an LL.B. He was admitted to the bar shortly afterwards and practiced law at 291 Broadway.

In 1920, Harris was elected to the New York State Senate as a Republican, representing New York's 4th State Senate district. He served in the Senate in 1921 and 1922. After he lost re-election, he opened a new law office at 140 Nassau Street. He remained active in Brooklyn Republican politics, serving as president of the 16th Assembly District Republican Club.

In 1904, Harris married Helen Westerhouse. Their son was William M. He was a member of the American Bar Association, the New York County Lawyers Association, the Brooklyn Bar Association, the Society of Medico-Legal Jurisprudence, the New York Guild for the Jewish Blind, the Brooklyn Lodge of the Elks, and the Menorah Lodge of the Masons. He was also organizer and president of the Borough Park Home Defense League and chairman of the Red Cross in Brooklyn. He served as president of the Borough Park Heights Civic Association, and played a leading role in the movement to build the West End subway line.

Harris died from a heart attack at the Seaside Hotel in Atlantic City, where he was on vacation with his wife, on April 14, 1933. He was buried in Acacia Cemetery in Bayside, Queens.

References

External links 

 The Political Graveyard

1876 births
1933 deaths
City College of New York alumni
New York University School of Law alumni
Lawyers from Brooklyn
Politicians from Brooklyn
People from Borough Park, Brooklyn
20th-century American lawyers
20th-century American politicians
Republican Party New York (state) state senators
American Freemasons
Burials in New York (state)